The VMI–William & Mary football rivalry  between the VMI Keydets and the William & Mary Tribe is a match-up between two historic public universities, the Virginia Military Institute and the College of William and Mary, in the state of Virginia. While the rivalry has lost intensity since William & Mary departed from the Southern Conference in 1977, the Tribe and Keydets maintain the series through frequent non-conference match-ups. The series is the second-longest for William & Mary (after the Capital Cup  with Richmond), and the longest for VMI at 88 games.
The football series began in 1905 and has been played a total of 88 times as of 2011.

History
The College of William and Mary was founded in Williamsburg, Virginia in 1693, and the Virginia Military Institute was founded in 1839 in Lexington, Virginia. The VMI Keydets football team was established in 1891, and the William & Mary team was founded two years later in 1893. VMI has hosted its home games in Lexington on the Parade Ground,  Alumni Field, and the current Alumni Memorial Field, which was constructed in 1962. William & Mary has hosted all of its home contests in Williamsburg at Zable Stadium (known as Cary Field until 1989). The game has also been played in Richmond, Lynchburg, Norfolk, Portsmouth, and Roanoke, Virginia as well as Bluefield, West Virginia (Mitchell Stadium).

Previously, the game was a conference match up when VMI and William & Mary were both members of the Southern Conference from 1936 until 1976. William & Mary then became an independent before joining the Yankee Conference in 1993. It has since been a member of the Atlantic 10 Conference for football, and is currently part of the Colonial Athletic Association. VMI remained a member of the Southern Conference until 2001 before leaving for the Big South Conference. The Keydets, however, moved back to the Southern Conference in 2013.

The most recent game was played on September 10, 2011 in Lexington with William & Mary defeating VMI 24–7. VMI has not won a contest between the two teams since 1985.

The two teams have scheduled a four-game, home-and-home football series beginning in 2024.

Game results

Source: Tribe Athletics

See also  
 List of NCAA college football rivalry games

References

College football rivalries in the United States
VMI Keydets football
William & Mary Tribe football
1905 establishments in Virginia
College sports in Virginia
Sports rivalries in Virginia